Chaetocladus capitatus is an extinct species of green algae in the genus Chaetocladus, which existed in what is now Cornwallis Island, Arctic Canada, during the Ludfordian age (Silurian period). It was described by Steven T. Loduca, Michael J. Melchin and Heroen Verbruggen in 2011 based on fossils found in the Cape Phillips Formation.

References 

Ulvophyceae
Ludfordian
Paleozoic life of Nunavut
Silurian Nunavut
Paleontology in Nunavut
Fossil taxa described in 2011